Let Freedom Ring, Inc. is an American conservative advocacy organization.

Organization
Let Freedom Ring, Inc. was founded in 2004, using seed funding consisting of a $1-million donation from John Templeton Jr., President of the John Templeton Foundation.  It is organized as a 501(c)(4) entity, and in 2014 created a super PAC as well.  Let Freedom Ring has employed Timothy Goeglein as a consultant, and has Colin Hanna as its President.  Hanna is a former County Commissioner in Chester County, Pennsylvania, and in his role as president has written on issues including a fence on the southern border, work visas, copyright, protest art of the tea party movement, the navy, the Iran deal, recipients of Weyrich Awards, and several Trump'16 campaign issues, in addition to regularly publishing about taxation.

Activities
In terms of political efforts, Let Freedom Ring concentrates on promoting conservative ideals within the Republican party, and on opposing liberal ideals of the Democratic party more broadly.

2004 cycle 
Let Freedom Ring has supported several religious causes.  It has advocated for a fence along the U.S.–Mexico border,  and promoted the neo-conservative agenda led by President George W. Bush, and campaigned actively in favor of keeping troops in Iraq as part of the war on terror political effort.

2008 cycle 
Let Freedom Ring ran attack ads against Obama in 2008.  It was involved in organizing the nationwide Tea Party movement protests on April 15, 2009, in part by sending out robocalls to potential participants the day before.  The organization received some signatures from Senators, on a pledge to give voters an opportunity to read Obamacare, and read it themselves, before voting on the bill.  Hanna, its president, said the treatment by the media of the topic of domestic terrorism, in particular renewed coverage of Timothy McVeigh in 2010, was being politicized.  As the broader right-wing opposition to the Obama administration unified, the organization supported the election of politicians associated with the Tea Party movement in 2010 and later years.  During 2011, it worked with tea-party-affiliated politicians and activists to oppose increasing the debt ceiling.

2012 cycle 
During the 2012 election cycle, the organization worked with other groups to get signatures from all major contenders for the Republican nominee in support of a balanced budget amendment, along with a campaign promise to cut federal spending if elected.  It signed the Mount Vernon statement with other conservative activist groups,  while continuing to oppose the Obama administration during his second term, and also continued to support religious causes.

The organization worked with Marco Rubio on immigration reform during 2013. During 2013, it opposed the Karl Rove-backed American Crossroads within the context of the Republican party primaries and caucuses, as well as criticized the congressional leadership John Boehner and Steve Scalise over the firing of RSC staffer Paul Teller, despite being initially tentatively supportive of Boehner as speaker.  Its president Colin Hanna was interviewed at CPAC in 2014.

2016 cycle 
The organization's president Hanna met with Scott Walker in May 2015, to discuss issues important to social conservatives such as abortion.  It again hosted a tax day protest in April 2016, with appearances by Grover Norquist as well as Bob Goodlatte, Peter Roskam, Tim Huelskamp, Andy Harris, John Ratcliffe, Dan Newhouse, and Jody Hice. Hanna did not back Trump'16 during the Republican primaries and caucuses; he attended the 2016 Republican National Convention as an alternate.

References

Notes

External links 
Let Freedom Ring USA website
We Need a Fence

Political and economic think tanks in the United States